Wally may refer to:

Music
 Wally (band), British prog rock band
 Wally (album), a 1974 album by Wally
 La Wally, an opera by Alfredo Catalani

Other uses
Wally (given name), a list of people and fictional characters
WALLY, a proposed service in southeast Michigan
Wally (anonymous), a name often called out at British rock venues in the 1970s and early '80s
The Wallies of Wessex, a group of people who squatted on ground close to Stonehenge in 1974
Wally the Green Monster, mascot of the Boston Red Sox
Wally Yachts, a maritime design and manufacture company
The Wally, trophy given to NHRA national event race winners
Wally, a Cockney dialect name for a large gherkin or pickled cucumber
Wally, an episode of the American TV series Highway to Heaven

See also 

Walley, a list of people with the surname or given name
Walley jump, a figure skating jump
Whalley (disambiguation)